Dell Richard Matthews (February 27, 1880 – December 10, 1938) was a Negro leagues pitcher for a few years before the founding of the first Negro National League.

He played for at least two years for Frank Leland and was playing for the team when they transitioned from the Chicago Union Giants into the Leland Giants.

References

External links
Baseball statistics and player information from Baseball-Reference Black Baseball Stats and Seamheads
 Adelbert Richard Matthews, History - Celebrating Black History, University of Wisconsin
 UW Athletics Black History: baseball players Adelbert Matthews and Julian Ware, University of Wisconsin

Leland Giants players
1880 births
1938 deaths
People from Chicago
People from Fox Lake, Wisconsin
20th-century African-American people